Francisc Spielmann (10 July 1916 – 21 November 1974) was a football player and coach of German ethnicity who played as a striker at international level for Romania and Hungary.

Career
Spielmann begin his football career in 1926, at Stăruința Oradea. In 1934, he appeared in the colors of CA Oradea and immediately became a member of the silver medal team. In 1940 he made a short break to UD Reșița and then he returned to Oradea, which was already in the Hungarian Championship. He was a member of the 1943-44 Hungarian Champion and the 1948-49 Romanian Champion. He was top-scorer for NAC in their Hungarian title-winning season, with 23 goals; he was also the Hungarian player of the year. In 1950, he was put on a free agent list overnight. He returned to his first football club, Stăruința Oradea, which was named Metalul Oradea, in the county championship. He managed to move up two classes with the team and retired in 1953.

International career
Between 1939 and 1949 he played 11 times for Romania and scored 4 goals. In the meantime, between 1940 and 1943 he was a member of the Hungary team. He went on track for seven times and scored 3 goals.

Personal life
Spielmann was born in Oradea of Romanian German descent.

Honours

Player
CA Oradea
Nemzeti Bajnokság I (1): 1943–44
Liga I (1): 1948–49

References

External links
 
 

1916 births
1974 deaths
Romanian people of German descent
Romanian sportspeople of Hungarian descent
Hungarian people of German descent
Hungarian people of Romanian descent
Sportspeople from Oradea
Romanian footballers
Hungarian footballers
Association football forwards
CA Oradea players
CSM Reșița players
Stăruința Oradea players
Liga I players
Liga II players
Nemzeti Bajnokság I players
Romania international footballers
Hungary international footballers
Dual internationalists (football)
Romanian football managers
Hungarian football managers